Suzanne Muzanne (born 17 March 1876, date of death unknown) was a French sculptor. Her work was part of the sculpture event in the art competition at the 1932 Summer Olympics.

References

1876 births
Year of death missing
20th-century French sculptors
French women sculptors
Olympic competitors in art competitions
20th-century French women